Moisés Xavier García Orellana (born 26 June 1990 in San Salvador, El Salvador) is a Salvadoran professional footballer.

Club career

San Salvador FC
García's professional career began on 3 July 2007, when he signed a contract with now defunct Salvadoran national league club, San Salvador F.C. He was one of six players from the El Salvador U17 national team, that would sign for San Salvador F.C. that season. The others were Ricardo Orellana, Diego Chavarría, William Maldonado, Óscar Arroyo and Fabricio Alfaro.

He made his professional debut on 7 November 2007 in a league match against C.D. Vista Hermosa.

Nejapa FC
García signed with Nejapa F.C. in 2008.

Luis Ángel Firpo
He signed with C.D. Luis Ángel Firpo in 2009.

International career
García made his debut for El Salvador in a May 2008 friendly match against Guatemala and had, as of December 2010, earned a total of 2 caps, scoring no goals. In December 2010 national team manager José Luis Rugamas named García in his 2011 UNCAF Nations Cup squad.

El Salvador's goal tally first.

Honours

Player

Club
C.D. Luis Ángel Firpo
 Primera División
 Champion: Clausura 2013

C.D. FAS
 Primera División
 Runners-up: Apertura 2015

References

External links
 Xavier García at Soccerway 

1990 births
Living people
Sportspeople from San Salvador
2011 Copa Centroamericana players
2011 CONCACAF Gold Cup players
2013 Copa Centroamericana players
2013 CONCACAF Gold Cup players
2014 Copa Centroamericana players
2015 CONCACAF Gold Cup players
Association football central defenders
Salvadoran footballers
El Salvador international footballers
San Salvador F.C. footballers
Nejapa footballers
C.D. Luis Ángel Firpo footballers